

Australian Capital Territory

Canberra region 
            
 Majura Parkway

Other freeways (no route number)
 Adelaide Avenue
 Yarra Glen
 Capital Circle
 Gungahlin Drive Extension
 Parkes Way 
 Tuggeranong Parkway

Gallery

New South Wales

New South Wales has the largest number and second highest density of motorways in Australia (behind Victoria), with the majority being located in Sydney City or the metropolitan areas.

Metropolitan Sydney region (urban motorways) 

 Speed limit varies between 60 km/h and 110 km/h.

 
 Gore Hill Freeway 
 Warringah Freeway 
 Sydney Harbour Tunnel (tolled for southbound traffic) 
 Cahill Expressway 
 Eastern Distributor (tolled for northbound traffic)
 Southern Cross Drive 
 General Holmes Drive, the Airport Tunnel

 
 Lane Cove Tunnel (tolled)
 M2 Hills Motorway 

 Mona Vale Rd (St Ives to Belrose, freeways grade road)
 Homebush Bay Drive (Freeway grade for southbound only)

 M4 Western Motorway (tolled east of Church Street, Parramatta)
 M4 East (tolled)
 Rozelle Interchange (Opening 2023)
 Anzac Bridge
 Western Distributor Freeway
 Bradfield Highway (Sydney) (toll)

 M5 South-West Motorway (tolled East of Heathcote Road, Liverpool and on Belmore Road Exit)
 M5 East Motorway (tolled)

Westlink M7 Motorway (tolled)

 
 Westconnex M8 Motorway (tolled)
 Burnt Bridge Creek Deviation

 The Northern Road

(Oran Park to Bringelly, freeway grade road as part of the Northern Road Upgrades)

 
James Ruse Drive (North of Hassall Street)
Gladesville Bridge, Hunters Hill – This route was built as part of the F3 but cancelled.

 M31 Hume Motorway (Urban Motorway from M5/M7 up to Campbelltown)

 Warringah Road Underpass

Unnumbered freeway grade roads

Cross City Tunnel (tolled)
NorthConnex (tolled)
 Burns Bay Road (South of Lane Cove West) – This route was built as part of the F3 but cancelled.
 Captain Cook Bridge, New South Wales – The only bit of F6 inside Sydney as a proposed extension but cancelled
Syd Einfield Road (The only part of F7)

Hunter and Central Coast region (rural and urban motorways) 
 Speed limit varies between 60 km/h and 110 km/h.

  
M1 Pacific Motorway (Sydney to Newcastle) (Formerly known as the )

Hunter Expressway

 
A37 Newcastle Inner City Bypass

 Teal Street and Stockton Bridge (Freeway Grade Road)
 Nelson Bay Road – 30% of this road is freeway grade (See full freeway grade route here )
 

 New England Highway (Maitland–Hexham)

 Motorway Link road ( only, not part of )

 Pacific Highway ( only, not part of ) – See full freeway route here

South Coast region (rural and urban motorways) 
 
M1 Princes Motorway 
 
Memorial Drive (Wollongong) – Most of this road is freeway grade – (The south 4 km of the road and the north 3 km of the road are, the central bit isn't though)

 Princes Highway, 16% of which is of motorway or dual carriageway standard.

Rural region (rural motorways) 

 Speed limit varies between 90 km/h and 110 km/h.

 Pacific Motorway (Northern NSW, from Ballina to QLD border)
 Pacific Highway, 100% of which is of motorway or dual carriageway standard, except for through Coffs Harbour and between Beresfield to Raymond Terrace – but still two lanes as arterial standards in each direction.

 Federal Highway

 Barton Highway – 21% of which is of motorway or dual carriageway standard, with the remainder under construction and proposed for completion by the end of 2023. See freeway route here 

 Hume Motorway
 Hume Highway, 100% of which is dual carriageway standard.

 Great Western Highway – Lithgow to Mount Lambie

Under construction 

 M1 Princes Motorway Extension
 Pacific Motorway

 
WestConnex Stage 3 (Major multibillion-dollar tollway/tunnels, connecting the M4 East to A4 Western Distributor and M5 East) – To be completed by 2023.
 Sydney Gateway (Connecting Sydney Airport to the St Peters Interchange and WestConnex) 

 Barton Highway duplication project (To be Completed by mid 2023)

 Newcastle Inner City Bypass Stage 5

In planning 

 M1 Pacific Motorway Extension
 Newcastle Bypass
 M1 Coffs Harbour Bypass

 Southconnex – M6 Motorway (Sydney) (F6 extension) – To be Complete by 2024.

 Western Harbour Tunnel & Beaches Link (Major multibillion-dollar tollway/tunnels, connecting WestConnex with the Gore Hill Freeway and Northern Beaches)
 Western Harbour Tunnel and Warringah Freeway Upgrade

  
 Outer Sydney Orbital – Estimated to be completed in 2040.  

 Western Sydney Airport Motorway (Major multimillion-dollar motorway, connecting the future Western Sydney Airport to the Westlink M7 Motorway)

Gallery

Northern Territory 
While the Northern Territory doesn't have any official freeways, parts of the Stuart Highway and the Tiger Brennan Drive are freeway grade roads with grade separate intersections.

See full freeway route here 

 Tiger Brennan Drive

Queensland

Brisbane region

 Bruce Highway (Bald Hills to Kybong)
 Gateway Motorway (Eight Mile Plains to Bald Hills)
 Pacific Motorway (NSW/QLD Border to Eight Mile Plains)

 Ipswich Motorway (Goodna to Dinmore) 
 Warrego Highway (Dinmore to Muirlea)
 Logan Motorway ( Gailes to Drewvale, Electronically Tolled) 
 Gateway Motorway ( Drewvale to Eight Mile Plains, Electronically Tolled)

 Inner City Bypass (Hale Street to Ludwyche Road)
 Pacific Motorway
 Riverside Expressway
 Gympie Arterial Road
 Hale Street

 Port of Brisbane Motorway

 Legacy Way
 Western Freeway
 Centenary Motorway

 Logan Motorway (Drewvale to Loganholme, Electronically Tolled)

 Ipswich Motorway (Goodna to Rocklea)
 Airport Link Tunnel ( Electronically Tolled)
 Clem Jones Tunnel (Clem7) ( Electronically Tolled)

 
 Cunningham Highway (Riverview to Yamanto)

'No shield'
 Southern Cross Way
 Inner City Bypass (Lutwyche Road to Kingsford Drive)

Motorway grade roads

 Moreton Bay Road (Freeway grade from Chandler to Capalaba)

 Mount Lindesay Highway (Freeway grade from Drewvale to North MacLean – see full route here )

Former motorways

Story Bridge Expressway

Gold Coast region

 Pacific Motorway

 Smith Street Motorway

Sunshine Coast region

 Bruce Highway

 Sunshine Motorway

Regional Queensland

 Bruce Highway (Bald Hills to Kybong, Townsville Ring Road)

 
 Toowoomba Bypass
 Warrego Highway (Helidon Spa to Charlton; / Helidon Spa to Mort Street Electronically tolled)
 Gore Highway (Charlton to Athol)

South Australia

In South Australia, expressway may refer to a controlled access highway with no at-grade intersections or a limited access road of slightly lower standard with at-grade intersections at some locations.

Unlike some other states, South Australia only uses the 'M' designation on grade separated freeways

 Princes Highway (SE Freeway to Tailem Bend)
 South Eastern Freeway
 Port Wakefield Road (Expressway grade road from Virginia to Port Wakefield)

 Northern Expressway
 North–South Motorway (incomplete, under construction in stages)
 Southern Expressway

 Port River Expressway
 Salisbury Highway – freeway grade from Port Wakefield Road to North–South Motorway

 Gawler Bypass – freeway grade road

Planned/proposed

 North–South Motorway: River Torrens to Darlington upgrade of South Road under investigation.

Tasmania

While Tasmania's highway network has been constructed to a high standard, its grade-separated freeway network is limited. In the past, Hobart and Launceston have each had comprehensive transport studies conducted, proposing grade-separated freeways running through and around them. While some of these roads have been constructed, the majority are limited access featuring at-grade intersections. Devonport and Burnie are the only major population centres with freeway standard roads linking each other. There have been repeated proposals in recent years to fully upgrade the Midland Highway to grade-separated freeway standard.

This List is limited to Tasmania's freeway-standard roads.

Hobart region

 Brooker Highway (Rosetta to Granton)
 Midland Highway (Brighton Bypass)
 
 Tasman Highway (Tasman Bridge to Hobart Airport)

 Southern Outlet (Hobart to Kingston)

 Channel Highway (Kingston Bypass)

Rural region

 Bass Highway (Burnie to Devonport and Prospect to Illawarra Main Road)
 Midland Highway (South Launceston to Breadalbane)

Victoria

Victoria has the second largest number (behind New South Wales) and highest density of freeways in Australia, with the majority being located in Melbourne City or the metropolitan areas. While most of Australia has a low population density over a large area, where towns are sparse or located a significant distance from each other; Victoria has towns located throughout the entire state, with large numbers of inhabitants, in both urban and rural areas (many of which are major) such as Ballarat or Bendigo. In addition to the roads listed below, Victoria has a number of dual carriageway standard Highways that are given an "M" designation. Whilst these roads are not officially Freeway standard, many of them may have a number of grade-separated intersections along the route. These routes are not listed below.

Melbourne region (urban freeways) 
Freeways within Greater Melbourne, speed limit varies between 60 km/h and 100 km/h.

 CityLink (Southern Link, Fully electronically tolled)
 Monash Freeway
Princes Freeway (East) (from Narre Warren to Pakenham, continues past Pakenham as Rural Freeway)
 Princes Freeway (West) (from Laverton North to Werribee, continues past Werribee as Rural Freeway)
 West Gate Freeway 
Note: "East" and "West" sections of Princes Freeway are officially part of the same freeway and route corridor.

 CityLink (Western Link, Fully electronically tolled)
 Tullamarine Freeway

 Eastern Freeway
 EastLink (Fully electronically tolled)
 Frankston Freeway

 Western Freeway (from Derrimut to Melton West, continues past Melton West as Rural Freeway)

 Mornington Peninsula Freeway

 Hume Freeway (from Thomastown to Wallan, continues past Wallan as Rural Freeway) – Not entirely freeway standard, In Kalkallo there is residential property, business and local road access with 80 km/h speed limit.

 Calder Freeway (from Essendon North to Keilor North, continues past Keilor North as Rural Freeway)

 Metropolitan Ring Road
 Western Ring Road

 South Gippsland Freeway

Rural region (rural freeways) 
On freeways outside of Greater Melbourne, the speed limit varies between 80 km/h and 110 km/h.

 Princes Freeway (East) (continues at Werribee towards Melbourne as Urban Freeway)
Princes Freeway (West) (continues at Pakenham towards Melbourne as Urban Freeway) – Not entirely freeway standard, In Yarragon and Trafalgar there is residential property, business and local road access with 60 km/h speed limit.
 Geelong Ring Road (officially part of Princes Freeway)

Note: "East" and "West" sections of Princes Freeway are officially part of the same freeway and route corridor.

 Western Freeway (continues at Melton West towards Melbourne as Urban Freeway)

 Hume Freeway (continues at Wallan towards Melbourne as Urban Freeway)

 Goulburn Valley Freeway

 Calder Freeway (continues at Keilor North towards Melbourne as Urban Freeway)

Under construction 
 West Gate Tunnel – Under construction, expected to be complete in 2025.

 Western Highway Duplication (Buangor to Stawell) – Commenced construction in 2017, currently on hold.

 North East Link – Under construction, expected to be complete in 2028.

Gallery

Western Australia

Western Australia has three named freeways – Kwinana Freeway, Mitchell Freeway, and Graham Farmer Freeway – but in addition has several highways that are in the process of being upgraded to full freeway standard and are considered part of the Perth freeway network. Their designation may remain as a highway though due to state restrictions on heavy vehicles (e.g. road trains) that are prevented by law from travelling on any road classed as a freeway.

Perth metro freeways
 
Kwinana Freeway 
Mitchell Freeway

Reid Highway (Erindale Road to Altone Road)
Roe Highway (Morrison Road to Great Eastern Highway Bypass, Great Eastern Highway Bypass to Tonkin Highway, Tonkin Highway to Kwinana Freeway)

Tonkin Highway (Great Northern Highway at Muchea to Hale Road, Mills Road to Champion Drive)

Leach Highway (Airport Drive to Welshpool Road)

Graham Farmer Freeway

Rural expressways / freeways
Forrest Highway – Southern extension of Kwinana Freeway at Mandurah through to Bunbury
Bussell Highway – Bunbury to Capel and from the south side of Capel to Busselton

Currently under construction in Perth
Mitchell Freeway Extension (Hester Avenue to Romeo Road)
Mitchell Freeway southbound widening – A third southbound lane is being added from Hodges Drive to Hepburn Avenue as well as an extra lane will be built from Hepburn Avenue entry ramp to Warwick Road exit ramp.
Leach Highway flyover over Leach Highway-Welshpool Road interchange. This will upgrade Leach Highway to expressway standard from the Manning Road lights through to the eastern end of Airport Drive at Perth International Airport.
Tonkin Gap project – the currently heavily congested section of Tonkin Highway between Collier Road and Great Eastern Highway upgraded to 3 lanes each way dual carriageway

Rural under construction
Bunbury Outer Ring Road extension – the Bunbury Outer Ring Road will be a freeway between Forrest Highway and South Western Highway
Albany Ring Road – phase 1, with phase 2 to commence straight after completion of phase 1

Future urban upgrades and new freeways in planning
Mitchell Freeway Extension (Romeo Road to Moore River)
Mitchell Freeway southbound – Installation of smart freeway technology with ramp metering from Hester Avenue to Vincent Street
Roe Highway Extension (Perth Freight Link) (Kwinana Freeway to Stirling Highway). Was under construction but this was halted at the last change of government. Its future remains unclear.
Roe Highway upgrade (Great Eastern Highway Bypass to Great Northern Highway)
Reid Highway upgrade (Erindale Road to Mitchell Freeway, Altone Road to Great Northern Highway)
Tonkin Highway upgrade (Hale Road to Mills Road)
Tonkin Highway upgrade (Champion Drive to Thomas Road)
Tonkin Highway Extension (Thomas Road to South Western Highway, Pinjarra)
Whiteman-Yanchep Freeway (Tonkin Highway/Gnangara Road to Mitchell Freeway (proposed)/Yanchep Beach Road)
Orrong Road Upgrade – Orrong Road to be upgraded to a 4 lane trenched expressway with service roads alongside from Graham Farmer Freeway to Leach Highway, rising onto a viaduct over Leach Highway and Division Street/Bell Street. May be extended in the future along Orrong and Welshpool Roads as far as Tonkin Highway.
Great Eastern Highway Bypass, where all current at grade intersections are planned to be removed and the road upgraded to full freeway standard.

Rural upgrades and new freeway in planning
Busselton Outer Bypass (BOB)
Perth-Adelaide Freeway "Orange Route" – (Roe Highway, Stratton to Great Eastern Highway bypass at Northam)

See also

 Highways in Australia
 Highway 1
 National Highway (Australia)
 Transport in Australia
 Road transport in Australia
 Toll roads in Australia
 List of roads and highways
 List of Australian airports
 List of Australian ports

References

Fre